The Ware Case is a 1917 British silent drama film directed by Walter West and starring Matheson Lang, Violet Hopson and Ivy Close. It is an adaptation of the play The Ware Case by George Pleydell Bancroft, filmed again in 1928 and in 1938.

Cast
 Matheson Lang - Sir Hubert Ware
 Violet Hopson - Lady Magdalene Ware
 Ivy Close - Marian Scales
 Gregory Scott - Michael Ayde
 George Foley - Sir Henry Egerton

References

External links

1917 films
Films directed by Walter West
1917 drama films
British drama films
British silent feature films
British films based on plays
British black-and-white films
1910s English-language films
1910s British films
Silent drama films